Mešeišta is a village in the municipality of Debarca, North Macedonia. It sits on the border between the Debarca Municipality and Ohrid Municipality, but administratively belongs to the formed.

Demographics
According to the 2002 census, the village had a total of 778 inhabitants. Ethnic groups in the village include:

Macedonians 776
Aromanians 1
Others 2

References

Villages in Debarca Municipality